Carl Ludwig von Bar (born Hanover, 1836; died 21 August 1913) was a German jurist.

Biography
He was trained in the universities of Göttingen and Berlin and was a member of the Reichstag during the years 1890-93. He was a strong advocate of publicity as well as of more humane procedure in all criminal trials. Sometime professor at Göttingen and a member of the Hague Tribunal, Bar acquired a worldwide reputation as a high authority on international law and a leading advocate of international arbitration.

Works
 Das Internationale Privat und Strafrecht (International civil and criminal law, 1862)
 Die Redefreiheit der Milglieder gezetzgebender Verssammlungen (Freedom of speech of lawmakers, 1868)
 Die Lehre vom Kausalzusammenhange im Rechte (The doctrine of causality in law, 1871)
 Das deutsche Reichsgericht (The court of the German Empire, 1875)
 Staat und Katholische Kirche in Preussen (The state and the Catholic Church in Prussia, 1883)

References

1836 births
1913 deaths
Jurists from Hanover
People from the Kingdom of Hanover
German Lutherans
German Free-minded Party politicians
Members of the 8th Reichstag of the German Empire
University of Göttingen alumni
Humboldt University of Berlin alumni
Academic staff of the University of Göttingen
19th-century German jurists
20th-century German jurists
19th-century Lutherans